The Tagore Law Lectures are an annual lecture series organised and hosted by the University of Calcutta, in India. The series is named after Prasanna Kumar Tagore, an Indian lawyer and politician, who established the series in 1868. The first lecture in the series was delivered by Herbert Cowell, in 1870, on Hindu law as administered in British courts in India.

History and Endowment 
The Tagore Law Lecture series was established in 1868 by Prasanna Kumar Tagore, an Indian lawyer and politician. In 1868, Tagore provided by his will that a law professor, to be known as the 'Tagore Law Professor' was to be appointed by the Senate of the University of Calcutta, and that this Professor's duties would be to: "...read or deliver, yearly at some place within the town of Calcutta, one complete course of Law Lectures, without charge to the students and other persons who may attend such Lectures."  Tagore's will further provided for the publication of a minimum of 500 copies of these lectures, to be distributed for free. In his inaugural lecture, Herbert Cowell noted that the intention of this bequest was apparently to encourage the preparation and publication of textbooks on Indian law. The Tagore Law Lectures were delivered by leading Indian, British, and American scholars and jurists, including Rash Behari Ghose, Gooroodas Banerjee, Sir Frederick Pollock, Roscoe Pound, and John Woodroffe, and former U.S. Supreme Court judge, William O'Douglas. H.M. Seervai, the Indian lawyer and constitutional law scholar, was also invited to deliver lectures for the series, but declined on the grounds that his professional commitments would not allow him to develop lectures that fit the series' standards of legal research.

In 2020, the Calcutta University published the Tagore Law Lectures delivered between 1868 and 1986 on their library website, making them publicly accessible, as part of an initiative to digitise records and rare documents.

Legacy 
Scholar and lawyer Rajeev Dhavan has described the Tagore Lecture Series as the 'most celebrated' of Indian endowed lectures on law, noting that the research produced for these lectures represents a 'black-letter' tradition, aimed at documenting the law and not critically assessing it. This assessment is echoed by e Rajkumari Agrawala, who has critiqued the series for its focus on a formalistic approach to law, and noted a lack of theoretical appreciation in the lectures delivered under this endowment.

The Tagore Law Lectures have been often cited by courts in India as references for the interpretation of Indian laws. The Privy Council in 1941 relied on Upendra Nath Mitra's Tagore Law Lecture in 1932, concerning the law of limitation. The Indian Supreme Court has relied on multiple Tagore Law Lectures including William O' Douglas's 1939 Lecture on comparative U.S. and Indian law, Julius Jolly's 1883 lecture on the Hindu law of partition, inheritance, and adoption and M.C. Setalvad's 1974 lecture on the relation between the Union and States in the Indian Constitution.

List of Lectures 
A list of the Tagore Law Lectures that have been delivered is below.

External links 

Tagore Law Lectures, University of Calcutta Library E-book Catalogue

References 

Lecture series
University of Calcutta
Tagore family
Law of India
1868 establishments in India